Chamoson-St-Pierre-de-Clages railway station is a railway station in the municipality of Chamoson, in the Swiss canton of Valais. It is an intermediate stop on the Simplon line and is served by local trains only. The station sits in the village of Saint-Pierre-de-Clages, near the 11th century cathedral of the same name.

Services 
The following services stop at Chamoson-St-Pierre-de-Clages:

References

External links 
 
 
 

Railway stations in the canton of Valais
Swiss Federal Railways stations